The 1965 Major League Baseball All-Star Game was the 36th midseason exhibition between the all-stars of the American League (AL) and the National League (NL), the two leagues comprising Major League Baseball. The game was played on July 13, 1965, at Metropolitan Stadium in Bloomington, Minnesota. The game resulted in a 6–5 victory for the NL.

Game summary
Traditionally, the managers of the winning pennant baseball teams of the previous year would have managed their respective leagues. However, with the firing of 1964 Yankees manager Yogi Berra, and the resignation of '64 Cardinals manager Johnny Keane (who then managed the Yankees), the second place managers (Al López of the White Sox and Gene Mauch of the Phillies) would manage their respective teams. In the National League, there had been a tie for second place, but Reds manager Fred Hutchinson had died in November 1964, making it unnecessary to break the tie.

After only five batters, the National League owned a 3–0 lead. Willie Mays hit a leadoff home run to left field off Milt Pappas, followed by a Willie Stargell single and a two-run Joe Torre homer.

Stargell's two-run homer in the second inning off Mudcat Grant made it 5–0. The NL was coasting until a four-run fifth inning against Jim Maloney, which included a pair of two-run homers by Dick McAuliffe and Harmon Killebrew, tying the game at 5-all.

The winning run scored in the seventh versus Sam McDowell on a walk to Mays, single by Hank Aaron, ground out by Roberto Clemente and infield hit by Ron Santo. Saving the game for the NL with two innings of relief was Bob Gibson, who, with Tony Oliva in scoring position after a ninth-inning double, struck out Killebrew and Joe Pepitone to end the game.

Attendance was announced as 46,706.

NL Starter Juan Marichal was named the game's MVP.

National League roster 
The National League roster included 13 future Hall of Famers.

Pitchers

Position players

Coaching staff

American League roster 
The American League roster included 7 future Hall of Famers.

Pitchers

Position players

Coaching staff

Game

Starting lineups

Umpires

Line score

External links 
 1965 All-Star Game baseball-almanac.com
 1965 All-Star Game baseball-reference.com

1965
Bloomington, Minnesota
All-Star Game
Major League Baseball All Star Game
July 1965 sports events in the United States
Baseball competitions in Minnesota